Popularly known as HVPM, this is a premier institute in India for physical training. It was set up by Mr Anant Vaidya and Mr Ambadas Vaidya around 1914. Earlier it was referred as Hanuman Akhada. Many political leaders and freedom fighters have visited HVPM. It is said that Shivaram Rajguru studied at HVPM. During his hideout Chandrashekhar Azad also stayed here for few days. The institution also has an engineering college in its campus run under the same management committee.

References

Physical education in India
Universities and colleges in Maharashtra
Education in Amravati